Richard Sears McCulloh (18 March 1818 – 1894) was an American civil engineer and professor of mechanics and thermodynamics at the Washington and Lee University, Lexington, Virginia.

Career

McCulloh was born on 18 March 1818 in Baltimore, Maryland, United States.
He graduated from the College of New Jersey in 1836, then studied chemistry in Philadelphia with James Curtis Booth from 1838 to 1839.
From 1846 to 1849 he worked for the U.S. Mint in Philadelphia.
He was elected to the American Philosophical Society in 1846. McCulloh was appointed professor of natural philosophy at Princeton University on 24 October 1849, and then professor of natural and experimental philosophy at Columbia College on 3 April 1854.

During the American Civil War, McCulloh disappeared from New York after the draft riots and in October 1863 McCulloh went to Richmond, Virginia to become the consulting chemist of the Confederate Nitre and Mining Bureau.
In response, Columbia College expelled him from his professorship.
While in Richmond, he helped "the Confederacy in making a chemical weapon".
His experiments in creating a lethal gas were proved successful in February 1865, but before the weapon could be used in practice Richmond fell in April 1865. McCulloh fled the city but was captured two months later off the coast of Florida, and for almost two years was imprisoned in the Virginia State Penitentiary.

After being released, in 1866 McCulloh was appointed to the new "McCormick Professorship of Experimental Philosophy & Applied Mathematics" at Washington and Lee College. 
He resigned later during financial retrenchment.
In 1869 he was a member of a faculty committee that created an expensive plan for expanding the Washington College curriculum dramatically.
In January 1870 he was a Professor of Natural Philosophy at Washington College.
In 1878, McCulloh received an honorary doctorate of law degree from Washington and Lee University.

Work

McCulloh was interested in a range of practical and scientific subjects. He prepared a plan for organizing the naval observatory.
He wrote on the use of hydrometers to measure sugar and alcohol content of liquids, and wrote a treatise on electricity.
He invented a method of refining California gold that involved combining the ore with zinc.
This invention was similar to an independent invention by his former teacher James Curtis Booth, and the two men agreed to combine their inventions into a single patent, which they sold to an interested industrialist.

In 1876, a collection of McCulloh's lecture notes were published in a book entitled Treatise on the Mechanical Theory of Heat and its Application to the Steam Engine, Etc. McCulloh acknowledged the pioneering work of James Prescott Joule and Nicolas Léonard Sadi Carnot in establishing the laws of thermodynamics. He went on to say of this discipline that "there are few, if any, branches of natural science which are not more or less dependent upon the great truths under consideration". He gave as an example the view that the body of an animal was essentially a heat engine, fueled by the food consumed.

Bibliography

References

Source bibliography

Further reading 
 
 
 

1818 births
1894 deaths
American civil engineers
Thermodynamicists
Washington and Lee University faculty
Princeton University faculty
Columbia University faculty